Ganki is a rural locality (a village) in Ustyuzhenskoye Rural Settlement, Ustyuzhensky District, Vologda Oblast, Russia. The population was 115 as of 2002. There are 2 streets.

Geography 
Ustyuzhna is the nearest rural locality.

References 

Rural localities in Ustyuzhensky District